President Harris may refer to:
 Lagumot Harris (1938–1999), 3rd president of Nauru
 René Harris (1947–2008), 8th president of Nauru

See also
 Kamala Harris (born 1964), 49th vice president of the United States